Turnip Top is a 1987 Spanish road movie and comedy film directed and starred by José Sacristán, also featuring Fernando Fernán Gómez, Marisa Paredes, Emilio Gutiérrez Caba, Miguel Rellán, Amparo Baró, and Amparo Soler Leal.

Plot 
The plot follows the aimless adventures of hitchhiking drifter Antonio ("cara de acelga") and his encounters with a number of colourful characters.

Cast

Production 
The film is an Incine, Lince Films, and Jet Films production. The screenplay was penned by Sacristán based on an original story by Sacristán and Carlos Pérez Merinero.

Release 
The film was theatrically released on 20 January 1987. It made an in-year gross of 30,893,384 ₧ (104,149 admissions).

Reception 
Jordi Batlle Caminal of El País deemed Turnip Top to be "a film peppered with a thousand and one anecdotes and a motley crew of colorful characters", "comedy in its sad state".

Accolades 

|-
| rowspan = "2" align = "center" | 1988 || rowspan = "2" | 2nd Goya Awards || Best Production Supervision || Marisol Carnicero  ||  || rowspan = "2" | 
|-
| Best Supporting Actress || Marisa Paredes || 
|}

See also 
 List of Spanish films of 1987

References 

Spanish road movies
Spanish comedy films
1987 comedy films
1980s Spanish-language films
1980s Spanish films